Water polo events were contested at the 2003 Summer Universiade in Daegu, South Korea.

References
 Universiade water polo medalists on HickokSports

2003 Summer Universiade
Universiade
2003
2003